John Thomas Cahill (November 17, 1903 – November 3, 1966), was a 20th-Century American lawyer and prosecutor.

Biography
Cahill was the son of a New York City Police Officer who had immigrated from Ireland. He attended Townsend Harris High School, a public school in New York and later attended Columbia University, A.B. (1924) and Harvard Law School, LL.B. (1927).

He joined the law firm of Cotton & Franklin, the predecessor to the firm that was to later bear his name, Cahill Gordon & Reindel.  He represented NBC, RCA, W.R. Grace & Co. and A&P, among other corporate giants.

Cahill served as United States Attorney for the Southern District of New York, from 1939 to 1941 and was the lead prosecutor in the trial of former United States Circuit Judge Martin T. Manton, which led to Manton's conviction.

Personal life
He was married to Grace Pickens who was one of the Pickens Sisters, a singing trio born on a Georgia plantation that reached national stardom in the 1930s with its own radio show, concert tours and records. They had 4 children. His daughter Catherine married William Lehman Bernhard (b. 1931), son of Dorothy Lehman Bernhard.

References 

1903 births
1966 deaths
American people of Irish descent
New York (state) lawyers
Columbia University alumni
Harvard Law School alumni
United States Attorneys for the Southern District of New York
20th-century American lawyers
People associated with Cahill Gordon & Reindel